KEXP-FM (90.3 MHz) is a non-commercial radio station licensed to Seattle, Washington, United States, specializing in alternative and indie rock programmed by its disc jockeys for the Seattle metropolitan area. The station is owned by the non-profit Friends of KEXP. KEXP hosts weekly programs dedicated to other musical genres, such as rockabilly, blues, world music, hip hop, electronica, punk, and alternative country. Live, in-studio performances by artists are also regularly scheduled. KEXP's studios are located at Seattle Center, while the transmitter is in the city's Capitol Hill neighborhood. In addition to a standard analog transmission, KEXP is available online.

KEXP was started as KCMU, the student-run station of the University of Washington (UW), in 1972. It became recognized for its significant impact on the regional music scene, including being the first station to play Nirvana and Soundgarden in the late 1980s. In the 1990s, it went through several significant changes, including a multi-year standoff between management and some DJs over programming policies. After partnering with the Experience Music Project, now the Museum of Pop Culture, in 2001, the station began to grow into one with an international listener base thanks to an early investment in internet streaming and its website. UW transferred the license to Friends of KEXP in 2014; as part of the agreement, KEXP is still considered an affiliate of the university.

History

KCMU: The early years
The University of Washington (UW)'s involvement in radio broadcasting dates to the 1952 launch of KUOW-FM, which moved to 94.9 MHz in 1958. The station served as an environment for training communications students and provided classical music, fine arts, and sports programming. However, in the early 1970s, university budget cuts led to an increased professionalization of that station and decreased student involvement. As a result, four UW undergraduates—John Kean, Cliff Noonan, Victoria ("Tory") Fiedler, and Brent Wilcox—began formulating a plan to create a second UW station, one that would be run by students. Noonan felt that there was insufficient student media in a time marked by student activism and protests; there was a student newspaper, the University of Washington Daily, and Noonan had come from San Francisco, where he was aware of other college stations. The four students formulated a proposal and were able to secure the backing of the UW Board of Regents, which promised funding if the students could get a station approved by the Federal Communications Commission (FCC). On July 13, 1971, UW filed an application for a new 10-watt non-commercial educational station on 90.5 MHz, which would be located in the Communications Building (abbreviated CMU on campus maps).

On October 5, the FCC granted the permit. It then fell to the students to put together the equipment and resources necessary to get KCMU going. Old turntables from a northwest Washington radio station, an old transmitter being discarded by KNHC at Nathan Hale High School as it was upgrading its own facilities; the students also received a $2,500 grant from the Board of Regents. Construction tasks included retrofitting a third-floor room in the building, erecting a transmitter tower atop McMahon Hall, and manually upgrading a telephone line to send audio from the Communications Building to the facility. KCMU began broadcasting on May 10, 1972. The limited-power station served few listeners; a 2007 column recounting the station's early history noted that it "barely reached the Ave", the commercial heart of Seattle's University District. The station split its airtime between information and "folk-rock and blues" music. That year, it sent reporters to both national political conventions. The station also produced alternative student-led coverage of UW athletic events, including women's basketball, which was not being aired at the time by the commercial rightsholder for university sports, KIRO.

While there were so few listeners in 1975 that UW administrators ordered a programming overhaul, by 1981, the station was starting to become more adventurous musically. Every weekday from 3 p.m. to midnight, the station was airing new wave music. That July, the station converted to a full-time new wave format after KZAM (1540 AM), a commercial outlet attempting the same format, changed due to low ratings. A power boost also came. In 1980, the university had filed to increase KCMU's power from 10 watts to 182 in the wake of changes to FCC regulations encouraging many 10-watt stations to increase power. The $5,000 upgrade, carried out in June 1982, also marked the beginning of stereo broadcasts for the first time. They also came as further university budget cuts meant the end of budgetary support from the UW's School of Communications; a one-time grant from the university student activities and fees committee kept the station on the air during the 1981–1982 school year and gave its backers time to hold fundraising events. This marked a permanent shift to being listener-supported, though KUOW provided engineering and accounting services. As part of its operating agreement, the station aired five-minute hourly newscasts prepared by the university's journalism students.

Another technical change came in January 1987, when the station moved from 90.5 to 90.3 MHz and to a tower site in the Capitol Hill neighborhood, using 400 watts. The technical changes came at a time when KCMU had commercial competition in the form of KJET (1590 AM), which had adopted the format in 1982. When NPR debuted the Sunday Weekend Edition in January 1987, KCMU picked up the program it displaced on KUOW-FM, the Canadian Broadcasting Corporation's Sunday Morning.

KCMU and the "Seattle sound"
KCMU was at the center of a new music scene in the mid-1980s. In the words of early 1980s music director Faith Henschel, the station had long been "very sympathetic to local bands" and already had a requirement that a local band must be played at least once every hour. In late 1985, Chris Knab, who co-founded 415 Records and was a former owner of Aquarius Records in San Francisco, sold his interest in 415 Records and became KCMU's station manager. The next year, Rolling Stone featured KCMU and other college stations in an article hailing them as growing "taste makers". Jonathan Poneman—who hosted a music show known as "Audioasis"—and Bruce Pavitt met at KCMU, leading to the foundation of Sub Pop. In a 2011 retrospective on grunge in Billboard, he noted that his "big break" was being a DJ at KCMU.

Through the UW at this time were passing a series of future influential figures with ties to bands. Mark Arm lived in Terry Hall for a time, going on to front Green River and Mudhoney. Kim Thayil had moved to Seattle to follow Pavitt; he won a prize on KCMU, was invited to be a full-time DJ, and not only graduated from the UW with a degree in philosophy but got his band Soundgarden exposure on KCMU, the first station to play them. Music director Henschel created a two-cassette compilation of songs by local groups, titled "Bands That Will Make You Money", and sent it to record labels; that led to Soundgarden getting signed to A&M Records. Soundgarden was not the only group that KCMU was breaking on the radio: in 1988, Kurt Cobain, looking for airplay for his band Nirvana, knocked on KCMU's door and handed the station a copy of his first single, "Love Buzz"; they did not play it until Cobain called from a gas station pay phone to request it. That same year, KCMU again became the only alternative music station in the Seattle market when KJET dropped the format.

While KCMU was becoming renowned in the grunge scene, its musical offerings were more varied. Under Henschel, the format was broadened to take in blues and African music, among other genres. The Sunday night Rap Attack was the first radio program in Seattle to play such artists as Ice-T, Eazy-E, and N.W.A. By the late 1990s, the program had changed names to Street Sounds, with hosts including DJ Nasty-Nes and Marcus "Kutfather" Tufono; it remains on KEXP's schedule.

By 1992, ten years after becoming listener-supported, KCMU's budget had grown from $20,000 to $180,000. In addition to the two technical improvements in the 1980s, it had added more paid staffers and listeners.

Strife and change in the '90s
In November 1992, seeking to professionalize the station's sound, KCMU management made the decision to dismiss nine volunteer disc jockeys to add two syndicated radio programs to the lineup: World Cafe from WXPN in Philadelphia and Monitoradio, produced by The Christian Science Monitor. The decision caused an outcry and led KCMU supporters to organize as Censorship Undermines Radio Station Ethics, abbreviated CURSE. Protests centered around the changes and their near-unilateral implementation. Management further inflamed tensions after firing one volunteer reporter, Dick Burton, who discussed the controversy in a newscast; station manager Knab stated that Burton had violated a station policy barring on-air criticism of KCMU and then suspended the station's volunteer news staff. In response, the news staff presented their resignations; one DJ, Riz Rollins, resigned; and CURSE encouraged listeners to withhold donations. It circulated flyers reading "KCMU Is Dying", with Poneman arguing that Knab and other paid staff wanted to turn KCMU into a "baby NPR, middle-of-the-road, vaguely alternative, soft-rock radio station". Several labels, including Sub Pop, Capitol Records, and C/Z Records, withheld record service to the station. The dispute reached the front page of Billboard, which called KCMU "one of the most influential commercial-free stations in the country".

The fight between KCMU management and CURSE, which led to KCMU discontinuing broadcasting between 1 and 6 am, made its way to the United States District Court for the Western District of Washington in January 1993. Three listeners and 11 staffers who claimed they were fired without warning argued in federal court that their First Amendment rights to free speech were being violated by KCMU, owned by the University of Washington, a state agency; they sued Knab and university director of broadcast services Wayne Roth. By the time of the lawsuit, 22 volunteers had left the station within two months.

In August 1994, federal judge Thomas Samuel Zilly ruled in favor of the KCMU staffers in Aldrich v. Knab, finding the no-criticism policy set out by Knab was unconstitutional, ordering six of the 11 staffers reinstated. (None of the staffers reclaimed their positions.) By this time, the debate was ameliorated; World Café was bumped to weekends, and UW gave KCMU $20,000 to help it get financially back on track. These moves reduced the impact of CURSE's decisions and helped bring back listeners and some record labels, resulting in a new KCMU that, per a profile in Rolling Stone, was sounding "more like the old KCMU".

In 1996, KCMU management opted to eliminate KCMU's 6 p.m. news and information hour, which it argued overlapped with KUOW-FM. It also noted that KBCS (91.3 FM) aired some of the same Pacifica Radio output that was on KCMU. That year, the station also hired its first three full-time paid DJs, marking the first time since sporadic attempts between 1989 and 1992 that air staff were paid. The last volunteer DJs were fired in 1997. However, two of the DJs that would come to define KEXP in the 2000s and 2010s were already in place in the last decade as KCMU. John Richards joined the station in the mid-1990s and got DJ shifts simply by showing up when others were not in the building. Cheryl Waters came aboard in 1994, hosting weekly live sessions recorded at the Jack Straw Cultural Center.

By the late 1990s, rumors of change and actual changes were swirling around KCMU. Reports suggested a possible combination of KUOW and KCMU with KPLU, a jazz station in Tacoma, was in the works, leaving open the possibility of a format change. The UW was preparing to move KCMU out of its namesake—the Communications Building—and into new studios to be shared with KUOW in the Ave. Arcade building at 45th Street and University Way as part of a plan to maximize classroom availability in campus buildings. In 1999, the university announced it would separate KCMU management from KUOW-FM and place it in the Office for Computing and Communications (C&C), which operated the campus's internet infrastructure, as a test bed for streaming and emerging technologies. Further, consistent rumblings were emerging of a potential partnership between the station and the Experience Music Project, then set to open the next year. The Experience Music Project was financed by Microsoft founder Paul Allen, with whom the UW was in discussions about other philanthropic donations, and Jon Kertzer, a former KCMU station manager, was involved with Allen's investment company, Vulcan Inc., on the EMP. In 2016, music director Don Yates would call the move under C&C "the best thing that ever happened to the station" because it resulted in major technological advancements.

In 2000, KCMU moved to Kane Hall on the UW campus. That year, it also started streaming high-quality, 128-kilobit-per-second MP3 compressed audio over the internet, becoming the first station in the world to offer online audio of this quality.

KEXP: Creation and expansion

On March 29, 2001, the UW unveiled a partnership with the EMP to transform KCMU in every way except its format. The license would still belong to the university, but the station would relocate to fully upgraded studios in the former home of KZOK at 113 Dexter Avenue North and change its call sign to KEXP-FM, increasing its power to 720 watts. The partnership combined the university, the radio station, the EMP, and the Allen Foundation for Music, which provided up to $600,000 over four years to UW. It also generated some concern over whether the station would lose its edge with the involvement of Allen, who owned two commercial stations in Portland, and whether the station needed listener support if it now had Allen's backing. The EMP partnership also marked the end of any UW student involvement with the station; Associated Students of the University of Washington started a new online-only campus station, Rainy Dawg Radio, in 2003. The KCMU call letters later recurred on KCMU-LP, a low-power station in Napa, California, whose founder worked at KCMU in Seattle while a student at the UW.

Over the next several years, KEXP grew wildly and brought in much more money. In 2002, the EMP financed 52 percent of KEXP's budget; it was self-reliant by 2006, when it brought in $3.3 million in revenue. In 2001, UW engineers invented CD players that could retrieve song metadata from the internet in order to build a real-time playlist; the next year, the station started offering a rolling archive of its last two weeks of programming, branching out to offer an archive of past in-studio performances. Despite changes in copyright royalties that made internet streaming much more expensive for many mid-sized groups, KEXP's affiliation with NPR meant that higher rates set by the Copyright Arbitration Royalty Panel did not apply to it. Web streaming was emerging as a major force for listenership around the world. From 2004 to 2005, weekly online listenership jumped from 26,000 to 50,000. A map in KEXP's studios, filled with yellow pins for listeners around the world, sprouted pins in places as far from Seattle as Tokyo, London, Mongolia, and Antarctica.

KEXP also added an additional terrestrial signal in Western Washington for a time. In 2004, KBTC, the radio station at Bates Technical College in Tacoma, was sold to Public Radio Capital for $5 million, with EMP then leasing it under the call letters KXOT to expand KEXP's signal. The Tacoma simulcast agreement was wound down in March 2006 as being too costly ahead of EMP ceasing to underwrite KEXP's losses, though KEXP did increase its power to its present 4,700 watts that year. The agreement had been a strain on KEXP's finances to the point where there was a possibility in the fall of 2004 that the station would not make payroll; a 2005 article in Seattle Weekly revealed that several staffers had counseled Mara against entering into the pact.

Joint venture with WNYE New York
New York City was one of the largest markets for KEXP streaming, and an opportunity arose for the station to expand there. In August 2007, WNYE (91.5 FM) "Radio New York", part of the NYC Media division of the New York City government, approached KEXP to begin a joint venture. Management was planning to overhaul the station's programming, and the deal also would help WNYE—long a station with a modest budget—gain an identity. KEXP output would be simulcast for 39 hours a week, including from 6 a.m. to noon each weekday, under the banner of "Radio Liberation".

On March 24, 2008, KEXP DJ John Richards's morning show, John in the Morning, was heard on both KEXP and WNYE for the first time. The other three programs produced for Radio Liberation—Wake Up, Music That Matters, and Mo'Glo—were custom for New York and did not air on KEXP. The plan was for KEXP to broadcast live from New York several times a year; Richards began splitting his time between live broadcasts in both New York and Seattle in June 2008.

The venture was never truly successful, largely because some of the intended audience was already streaming KEXP; the Great Recession, which began months after the alliance started, reduced marketing budgets and led to the layoffs of KEXP's New York-oriented operations staffers. The relationship ended on June 1, 2011: WNYE replaced KEXP programming with a morning simulcast of Fordham University-owned 90.7 WFUV in New York, airing adult album alternative (AAA) music.

Move to Seattle Center

In 2011, the station announced that it would relocate its studios to the Seattle Center. The new facilities, to be located in the Northwest Rooms area of the center, would enable community members to watch performances and provide more room. The Seattle Center facility opened in December 2015 with a $15 million capital campaign, chaired by Mike McCready of Pearl Jam, nearly complete; a group of staffers paraded from the Dexter Avenue facility to the new studios. Among the amenities in the new studios are a performance space four times the size of that at the Dexter Avenue studios; an indoor gallery; a "live room" to record performances for the station's YouTube channel; a coffee shop; and a washer and dryer so visiting musicians can do laundry. As part of the move into Seattle Center, the KCMU-KEXP music archive, with 41,000 CDs, was collated into a digital system using autoloader "robots" that could handle 100 CDs each; selected vinyl albums from the station's collection of 12,000 records were also digitized. By the time of the move, KEXP was reaching 206,000 listeners a week, a quarter of them streaming the station.

In 2014, Friends of KEXP, the non-profit created in 2001 to manage the station as part of the EMP partnership, purchased the station license from the UW for $4 million in a transition suggested by university officials amidst the Seattle Center capital campaign. The $4 million was provided in $400,000 a year of on-air announcements and advertising over 10 years.

In 2018, KEXP announced that it had received a bequest of nearly $10 million from an out-of-state listener identified only as "Suzanne", which would be used to establish a permanent endowment, fund an education and outreach team, and deepen the station's work with musicians. The station attributed its ability to secure the bequest to efforts to grow relationships with donors started during the capital campaign. That year, the station also announced that it would be the "official music partner" of the Seattle Kraken, responsible for all in-game music and music entertainment surrounding the team.

In July 2020, KEXP revamped its lineup and its programming as part of what it called "an initial public step in advancing KEXP's commitment to becoming an anti-racist organization" and increasing the diversity of the music and its staff. Several DJs were promoted to new executive positions, and two shows hosted by Black DJs were added to a daytime lineup that was once dominated by Richards, Cheryl Waters, and Kevin Cole. The station also broadened its music mix; per a 2019 analysis by Tableau Software, 24 of the top 25 artists played on the station in 2019 were predominantly White.

Tom Mara, who was executive director of KCMU and KEXP for 31 years and who had volunteered for the station in the late 1980s as a UW student, announced his retirement as of June 30, 2022. Under Mara, the station had grown to $12.5 million in annual revenue by 2020. The station opted to promote its chief operating officer, Ethan Raup, to CEO.

In 2022, KEXP and four other arts organizations wrote to Sound Transit, Seattle's regional transit agency, expressing concern that the construction of Link light rail to Seattle Center could displace them for as long as five years. In a letter, the groups warned that a proposed new station underneath Republican Street could make occupancy of their present spaces "untenable" and require digging under the facilities occupied by KEXP and The Vera Project.

References

External links

 
 
 

EXP-FM
EXP-FM
University of Washington
Radio stations established in 1972
NPR member stations
1972 establishments in Washington (state)